Oplatocera is a genus of longhorn beetle with about ten species distributed in Asia. The genus is identified by the wide mandibles without teeth on their inner edge with the base being hairy. The antenna base has a thick joint and the third segment is longer than the fourth and the segments shorten from base to tip. The third to seventh antennal segments have spines on the outer margins in some species. 

Species are divided into two subgenera and the species currently included in the genus are:
 Subgenus Epioplatocera 
 Oplatocera chujoi  - Philippines (Mindanao)
 Oplatocera detersa  - Sumatra
 Oplatocera halli  - South India
 Oplatocera khasimontana  - NE India (Assam, Khasi Hills)
 Oplatocera maculata  - Vietnam (Tonkin)
 Oplatocera mandibulata  - Taiwan
 Oplatocera mitonoi  - Taiwan
 Oplatocera oberthuri  - Himalayas
 Oplatocera shibatai  - Borneo, W. Malaysia
 Oplatocera siamensis  - Thailand (Chiang Mai)
 Oplatocera simulata  - Laos (Hua Phan)
 Subgenus Oplatocera  (synonym Hoplitocera )
 Oplatocera aurociliata  - NE Laos
 Oplatocera callidioides  - China (Sichuan), Taiwan, "North India" Laos
 Oplatocera grandis  - China (Sichuan),
 Oplatocera perroti  - Vietnam (Tonkin)

References 

Cerambycidae genera
Xystrocerini